Judgement 2013 was a professional wrestling event promoted by DDT Pro-Wrestling (DDT). It took place on March 20, 2013, in Tokyo, Japan, at the Korakuen Hall. It was the seventeenth event under the Judgement name. The event aired domestically on Fighting TV Samurai.

Storylines
Judgement 2013 featured seven professional wrestling matches that involved different wrestlers from pre-existing scripted feuds and storylines. Wrestlers portrayed villains, heroes, or less distinguishable characters in the scripted events that built tension and culminated in a wrestling match or series of matches.

Event
The first match of the main card was Kazuki Hirata's return match.

The fourth match featured the veteran Tatsumi Fujinami in a quick bout against Konosuke Takeshita.

Next was a match that saw the professional wrestling debut of Kizaemon Saiga, a Japanese kickboxer and mixed martial artist.

Next was the Right To Challenge Anytime, Anywhere Contract Battle Royal for a KO-D Openweight Championship match at April Fool 2013, on April 13. Four envelopes were suspended above the ring, each containing a "Right To Challenge Anytime, Anywhere" contract, giving the right to their holder to challenge any champion at any time in the following year. Grabbing a contract resulted in being eliminated from the match.

Results

Right To Challenge Anytime, Anywhere Contract Battle Royal

References

External links
The official DDT Pro-Wrestling website

2013
2013 in professional wrestling
Professional wrestling in Tokyo